The 1996 Internazionali Femminili di Palermo was a women's tennis tournament played on outdoor clay courts in Palermo, Italy that was part of Tier IV of the 1996 WTA Tour. It was the ninth edition of the tournament and was held from 15 July until 21 July 1996. Fourth-seeded Barbara Schett won the singles title.

Finals

Singles

 Barbara Schett defeated  Sabine Hack 6–3, 6–3
 It was Schett's 1st title of the year and the 1st of her career.

Doubles

 Janette Husárová /  Barbara Schett defeated  Florencia Labat /  Barbara Rittner 6–1, 6–2
 It was Husárová's 1st title of the year and the 1st of her career. It was Schett's 2nd title of the year and the 2nd of her career.

References

External links
 ITF tournament edition details
 Tournament draws

Internazionali Femminili di Palermo
Internazionali Femminili di Palermo
1996 in Italian women's sport
Torneo